King of the Circus is a 1920 American action film serial directed by J. P. McGowan. The film is considered to be lost.

Cast
 Eddie Polo as Eddie King
 Corrine Porter as Helen Howard
 Kittoria Beveridge as Mary Warren
 Harry Madison as James Gray
 Charles Fortune as John Winters
 J. P. McGowan
 J.J. Bryson
 Dorothy Hagan
 Viola Tasma
 Tom London (as Leonard Clapham)
 Jay Marchant
 Frank Shaw
 Bruce Randall
 Jack Newton

Chapter titles

Bloody Money
The Mushroom Bullet
Stolen Evidence
Facing Death
The Black Wallet
The Lion's Claws
Over the City
Treachery
Dynamite
The Mystic Power (aka The Mystic's Power)
Man and Beast
Deep Waters
A Fight for Life
Out of the Clouds
The Woman in Black
The Cradle of Death
The Final Reckoning
The Lost Heritage

See also
 List of film serials
 List of film serials by studio
 List of lost films

References

External links

1920 films
1920s action films
1920 lost films
American silent serial films
American black-and-white films
Universal Pictures film serials
Films directed by J. P. McGowan
Circus films
Lost American films
American action films
Lost action films
1920s American films
Silent action films